Todor Todorov  (born 2 November 1928) is a Bulgarian gymnast. He competed in eight events at the 1952 Summer Olympics.

References

External links
 

1928 births
Living people
Bulgarian male artistic gymnasts
Olympic gymnasts of Bulgaria
Gymnasts at the 1952 Summer Olympics
Place of birth missing (living people)